Love O2O is a 2016 Chinese television series based on the novel of the same name written by Gu Man, starring Zheng Shuang and Yang Yang. It aired on Jiangsu TV and Dragon TV from 22 August to 6 September 2016.This story tells a love story between Xiao Nai and Bei Weiwei. It is a commercial success in China. It is one of the most-watched Chinese modern dramas, with over 25.2 billion views online.

In August, 2021 this show has been officially banned by the People's Republic of China's government in the entirety of Mainland China as the female lead role, Zheng Shuang has been labelled as "actors with poor conduct" by the regulators due to her involvement in a series of scandals including tax evasion which she is found guilty of.

Synopsis
Bei Weiwei (Zheng Shuang) is a computer science university student, who excels in her studies. She aspires to be an online game developer. Her player's name is Luwei Weiwei in the role-playing game, A Chinese Ghost Story. After she is dumped by her online husband Zhenshui Wuxiang, she is approached by the number one player Yixiao Naihe, who suggests they get married so they both can participate in the couples in-game competitions. The newlyweds instantly hit it off and undergo many adventures together in-game.

However, Wei Wei did not expect the real identity of her in-game husband to be a college senior, Xiao Nai (Yang Yang) who is a jock and academician. After they meet each other, they fall in love. Together, they overcome numerous misunderstandings and obstacles standing in the way of their budding romance.

Cast

Main

Supporting

People at Qing University

People in Zhi Yi Technology

Characters in A Chinese Ghost Story

Others

Production
The series was filmed at Shanghai Songjiang University Town, East China University of Political Science and Law and Shanghai Commercial Plaza from September to December 2015.

The fictional game in the universe uses the content provided by A Chinese Ghost Story, a popular MMORPG game in China.

Soundtrack

Reception
The series ranked first in television ratings and became the number one most searched and discussed topic online during its broadcast. The drama is also well-received internationally.

The drama was praised for following the details of the novel faithfully, as well as its refreshing and unique plot. Unlike most dramas, Love O2O does not succumb to overused cliches and plot devices, making it stand out from dramas with similar themes.

Ratings 

 Highest ratings are marked in red; lowest ratings are marked in blue.
 In China, 1% viewership rating is considered extremely high since the People's Republic of China has a large population.                                                          (1,441,494,608 as of Saturday, November 21, 2020)

Awards and nominations

International broadcast

See also
Love
 O2O (film)

References

External links
 

Chinese romantic comedy television series
2016 Chinese television series debuts
Television shows based on Chinese novels
2016 Chinese television series endings
Television shows set in China
Mandarin-language television shows
2010s college television series
Jiangsu Television original programming
Dragon Television original programming
Television series by Croton Media
Love O2O